The XPT Service Centre is a railway depot operated by NSW TrainLink in , Sydney.

History
The XPT Service Centre was built within the confines of Meeks Road triangle between the Bankstown, Illawarra and Metropolitan lines immediately south of Sydenham station in 1981 to service the new XPT fleet. On 20 May 1994, an automatic washer was opened.

As well as being the home depot for the XPT fleet, Endeavour and Xplorer railcars visit the depot to be washed and refueled. It also services the Australian Rail Track Corporation's track inspection train when it is in Sydney.

For many years, 7301 was the depot's shunter. Since its withdrawal, this function has been performed by Pacific National and RailCorp 48 class locomotives.

References

Industrial buildings in Sydney
NSW TrainLink
Railway workshops in New South Wales
1981 establishments in Australia